The Ancholme Group is a geologic group in England. It preserves fossils dating back to the Jurassic period. It has previously been referred to as the Ancholme Clay Group. The group consists of predominantly grey, marine mudstone and silty mudstone with beds of argillaceous limestone nodules. In parts of its range it interfingers with the Corallian Group, which predominantly consists of coralliferous limestones.

See also 

 List of fossiliferous stratigraphic units in England

References

 

Jurassic England